The 1996–97 NBA season was the Los Angeles Lakers' 49th season in the National Basketball Association, and 37th in the city of Los Angeles. This season was mostly remembered for the Lakers signing free agent All-Star center Shaquille O'Neal to a seven-year, $120 million deal, and acquiring high school basketball star Kobe Bryant from the Charlotte Hornets, who selected him with the 13th pick in the 1996 NBA draft during the off-season. The team also signed former Lakers guard Byron Scott from the "Showtime" era, signed free agents Jerome Kersey, and Sean Rooks, and acquired rookie center Travis Knight from the Chicago Bulls. In January, they traded Cedric Ceballos back to his former team, the Phoenix Suns in exchange for Robert Horry, who won two championships with the Houston Rockets. The Lakers had the eighth best team defensive rating in the NBA.

The Lakers played strong basketball as they had the best record in the Western Conference at the All-Star break with a 35–13 record, but soon slipped out of first place finishing second in the Pacific Division with a 56–26 record. O'Neal averaged 26.2 points per game, 12.5 rebounds and 2.9 blocks per game, but only played 51 games due to a knee injury. He was also named to the All-NBA Third Team. In addition, Eddie Jones averaged 17.2 points and 2.4 steals per game, while Nick Van Exel provided the team with 15.3 points and 8.5 assists per game, Elden Campbell contributed 14.9 points, 8.0 rebounds and 1.5 blocks per game, and Kersey provided with 6.8 points, 5.2 rebounds and 1.7 steals per game. O'Neal and Jones were both selected for the 1997 NBA All-Star Game, but O'Neal did not play due to injury. Off the bench, Bryant contributed 7.6 points per game, and Knight averaged 4.8 points and 4.5 rebounds per game; Bryant and Knight were both named to the NBA All-Rookie Second Team, while Bryant won the Slam Dunk Contest during the All-Star Weekend in Cleveland.

In the Western Conference First Round of the playoffs, the Lakers defeated the Portland Trail Blazers in four games. However, in the Western Conference Semi-finals, they lost in five games to regular season MVP Karl Malone, John Stockton and the Utah Jazz. The Jazz would reach the NBA Finals for the first time, but would lose to the defending champion Chicago Bulls in six games. Following the season, Scott went overseas and signed with the Greek Basket League giants Panathinaikos for the 1997–98 season, while Kersey signed as a free agent with the Seattle SuperSonics, and Knight signed with the Boston Celtics.

One notable highlight of the season was the Lakers holding the Dallas Mavericks to just two points in the third quarter, in an 87–80 home win on April 6, 1997. It was the fewest points scored in a quarter of a game in NBA history.

Draft picks

Before he was chosen as the 13th overall draft pick by the Charlotte Hornets in 1996, the 17-year-old Bryant had made a lasting impression on then-Lakers general manager Jerry West, who immediately foresaw potential in Bryant's basketball ability during pre-draft workouts. He went on to state that Bryant's workouts against former Lakers players and then assistant coaches Michael Cooper, and Larry Drew were the best he had ever seen. Immediately after the draft, Bryant expressed that he did not wish to play for the Hornets and wanted to play for the Lakers instead. Fifteen days later, West traded his starting center, Vlade Divac to the Hornets for the young Kobe Bryant.

Roster

Regular season

Kobe's rookie season
During his first season, Bryant mostly came off the bench behind guards Eddie Jones and Nick Van Exel. Initially, he played limited minutes, but as the season continued, he began to see some more playing time. He earned himself a reputation as a high-flyer and a fan-favorite by winning the 1997 Slam Dunk Contest during the All-Star Weekend in Cleveland. He averaged 7.6 points and 15.5 minutes per game in 71 games, and was named to the NBA All-Rookie Second Team.

Season standings

Record vs. opponents

Game log

Regular season

|- style="background:#cfc;"
| 1
| November 1
| Phoenix
| W 96-82
| Shaquille O'Neal (23)
| Shaquille O'Neal (14)
| Nick Van Exel (8)
| Great Western Forum17,505
| 1-0
|- style="background:#cfc;"
| 2
| November 3
| Minnesota
| W 91-85
| Shaquille O'Neal (35)
| Shaquille O'Neal (19)
| Nick Van Exel (11)
| Great Western Forum15,407
| 2-0
|- style="background:#cfc;"
| 3
| November 5
| @ New York
| W 98-92
| Shaquille O'Neal (26)
| Shaquille O'Neal (13)
| Nick Van Exel (8)
| Madison Square Garden19,763
| 3-0
|- style="background:#fcc;"
| 4
| November 6
| @ Charlotte
| L 78-88
| Shaquille O'Neal (22)
| Shaquille O'Neal (10)
| Nick Van Exel (7)
| Charlotte Coliseum24,042
| 3-1
|- style="background:#fcc;"
| 5
| November 8
| @ Toronto
| L 92-93
| Jones & O'Neal (25)
| Shaquille O'Neal (10)
| Campbell & Van Exel (4)
| SkyDome27,357
| 3-2
|- style="background:#cfc;"
| 6
| November 10
| Atlanta
| W 92-85
| Jones & O'Neal (19)
| Shaquille O'Neal (18)
| Nick Van Exel (5)
| Great Western Forum16,097
| 4-2
|- style="background:#cfc;"
| 7
| November 12
| @ Houston
| W 126-115 (2OT)
| Shaquille O'Neal (34)
| Shaquille O'Neal (15)
| Nick Van Exel (14)
| The Summit16,285
| 5-2
|- style="background:#fcc;"
| 8
| November 13
| @ San Antonio
| L 83-95
| Shaquille O'Neal (30)
| Shaquille O'Neal (10)
| Nick Van Exel (8)
| Alamodome26,002
| 5-3
|- style="background:#cfc;"
| 9
| November 15
| L.A. Clippers
| W 107-100
| Eddie Jones (32)
| Elden Campbell (10)
| Nick Van Exel (15)
| Great Western Forum16,207
| 6-3
|- style="background:#cfc;"
| 10
| November 17
| @ Phoenix
| W 102-88
| Eddie Jones (18)
| Shaquille O'Neal (13)
| Nick Van Exel (9)
| American West Arena19,023
| 7-3
|- style="background:#cfc;"
| 11
| November 19
| @ Golden State
| W 112-109
| Nick Van Exel (27)
| Shaquille O'Neal (12)
| Nick Van Exel (12)
| San Jose Arena18,742
| 8-3
|- style="background:#fcc;"
| 12
| November 20
| Utah
| L 97-113
| Shaquille O'Neal (26)
| Shaquille O'Neal (15)
| Nick Van Exel (11)
| Great Western Forum16,122
| 8-4
|- style="background:#cfc;"
| 13
| November 22
| San Antonio
| W 96-86
| Shaquille O'Neal (29)
| Shaquille O'Neal (21)
| Nick Van Exel (9)
| Great Western Forum17,505
| 9-4
|- style="background:#fcc;"
| 14
| November 24
| Houston
| L 85-90
| Shaquille O'Neal (23)
| Shaquille O'Neal (11)
| Nick Van Exel (12)
| Great Western Forum17,505
| 9-5
|- style="background:#cfc;"
| 15
| November 26
| @ Philadelphia
| W 100-88
| Jones & O'Neal (23)
| Shaquille O'Neal (20)
| Jones & Van Exel (6)
| CoreStates Center20,652
| 10-5
|- style="background:#fcc;"
| 16
| November 27
| @ Boston
| L 94-110
| Shaquille O'Neal (22)
| Shaquille O'Neal (10)
| Shaquille O'Neal (5)
| Fleet Center18,624
| 10-6
|- style="background:#cfc;"
| 17
| November 29
| @ Detroit
| W 84-76
| Shaquille O'Neal (27)
| Elden Campbell (12)
| Nick Van Exel (10)
| The Palace of Auburn Hills21,454
| 11-6

|- style="background:#cfc;"
| 18
| December 1
| Denver
| W 104-96
| O'Neal & Van Exel (24)
| Shaquille O'Neal (16)
| Shaquille O'Neal (8)
| Great Western Forum15,684
| 12-6
|- style="background:#cfc;"
| 19
| December 3
| Seattle
| W 110-106
| Shaquille O'Neal (32)
| Shaquille O'Neal (14)
| Eddie Jones (9)
| Great Western Forum17,505
| 13-6
|- style="background:#fcc;"
| 20
| December 4
| @ Utah
| L 75-101
| Shaquille O'Neal (21)
| Shaquille O'Neal (8)
| Derek Fisher (3)
| Delta Center19,911
| 13-7
|- style="background:#cfc;"
| 21
| December 6
| Orlando
| W 92-81
| Shaquille O'Neal (25)
| Shaquille O'Neal (18)
| Nick Van Exel (11)
| Great Western Forum17,505
| 14-7
|- style="background:#cfc;"
| 22
| December 8
| Minnesota
| W 110-86
| Nick Van Exel (23)
| Shaquille O'Neal (10)
| Nick Van Exel (7)
| Great Western Forum15,212
| 15-7
|- style="background:#cfc;"
| 23
| December 10
| @ Sacramento
| W 92-90
| Shaquille O'Neal (27)
| Shaquille O'Neal (13)
| Derek Fisher (6)
| ARCO Arena17,317
| 16-7
|- style="background:#cfc;"
| 24
| December 11
| Indiana
| W 79-76
| Shaquille O'Neal (33)
| Shaquille O'Neal (10)
| Nick Van Exel (8)
| Great Western Forum16,139
| 17-7
|- style="background:#cfc;"
| 25
| December 13
| Portland
| W 120-119 (OT)
| Shaquille O'Neal (34)
| Shaquille O'Neal (10)
| Nick Van Exel (15)
| Great Western Forum16,315
| 18-7
|- style="background:#fcc;"
| 26
| December 17
| @ Chicago
| L 123-129 (OT)
| Nick Van Exel (36)
| Elden Campbell (14)
| Nick Van Exel (6)
| United Center23,919
| 18-8
|- style="background:#cfc;"
| 27
| December 18
| @ Milwaukee
| W 111-105
| Shaquille O'Neal (41)
| Shaquille O'Neal (13)
| Nick Van Exel (11)
| Bradley Center16,829
| 19-8
|- style="background:#fcc;"
| 28
| December 21
| @ Minnesota
| L 88-103
| Nick Van Exel (22)
| Shaquille O'Neal (17)
| Nick Van Exel (9)
| Target Center18,127
| 19-9
|- style="background:#cfc;"
| 29
| December 25
| @ Phoenix
| W 108-87
| Shaquille O'Neal (26)
| Shaquille O'Neal (16)
| Nick Van Exel (12)
| American West Arena19,023
| 20-9
|- style="background:#cfc;"
| 30
| December 27
| Boston
| W 109-102
| Shaquille O'Neal (25)
| Campbell & O'Neal (11)
| Jones & Van Exel (5)
| Great Western Forum17,505
| 21-9
|- style="background:#cfc;"
| 31
| December 29
| Philadelphia
| W 115-102
| Shaquille O'Neal (28)
| Travis Knight (10)
| Nick Van Exel (11)
| Great Western Forum17,505
| 22-9

|- style="background:#cfc;"
| 32
| January 2
| @ Sacramento
| W 90-83
| Shaquille O'Neal (25)
| Shaquille O'Neal (16)
| Nick Van Exel (6)
| ARCO Arena17,317
| 23-9
|- style="background:#cfc;"
| 33
| January 3
| Sacramento
| W 100-93
| Elden Campbell (22)
| Elden Campbell (15)
| Derek Fisher (6)
| Great Western Forum17,505
| 24-9
|- style="background:#cfc;"
| 34
| January 5
| @ Vancouver
| W 95-82
| Shaquille O'Neal (31)
| Shaquille O'Neal (12)
| Nick Van Exel (23)
| General Motors Place19,193
| 25-9
|- style="background:#fcc;"
| 35
| January 6
| @ Portland
| L 84-88
| Shaquille O'Neal (34)
| Shaquille O'Neal (12)
| Nick Van Exel (9)
| Rose Garden21,538
| 25-10
|- style="background:#cfc;"
| 36
| January 8
| Charlotte
| W 101-97
| Shaquille O'Neal (23)
| Shaquille O'Neal (16)
| Nick Van Exel (10)
| Great Western Forum16,980
| 26-10
|- style="background:#cfc;"
| 37
| January 10
| Miami
| W 94-85
| Shaquille O'Neal (34)
| Shaquille O'Neal (14)
| Nick Van Exel (8)
| Great Western Forum17,505
| 27-10
|- style="background:#cfc;"
| 38
| January 14
| Vancouver
| W 91-81
| Shaquille O'Neal (24)
| Knight & O'Neal (12)
| Nick Van Exel (6)
| Great Western Forum15,606
| 28-10
|- style="background:#fcc;"
| 39
| January 16
| Portland
| L 98-102
| Shaquille O'Neal (33)
| Shaquille O'Neal (13)
| Nick Van Exel (8)
| Great Western Forum16,432
| 28-11
|- style="background:#fcc;"
| 40
| January 18
| Detroit
| L 97-100 (2OT)
| Kobe Bryant (21)
| Shaquille O'Neal (19)
| Nick Van Exel (9)
| Great Western Forum17,505
| 28-12
|- style="background:#cfc;"
| 41
| January 20
| Dallas
| W 109-99
| Nick Van Exel (24)
| Shaquille O'Neal (13)
| Nick Van Exel (8)
| Great Western Forum16,959
| 29-12
|- style="background:#cfc;"
| 42
| January 24
| Golden State
| W 114-97
| Shaquille O'Neal (33)
| Travis Knight (15)
| Nick Van Exel (12)
| Great Western Forum17,505
| 30-12
|- style="background:#cfc;"
| 43
| January 26
| @ Seattle
| W 104-103
| Nick Van Exel (25)
| Shaquille O'Neal (11)
| Nick Van Exel (6)
| KeyArena17,072
| 31-12
|- style="background:#cfc;"
| 44
| January 28
| @ Dallas
| W 102-83
| Shaquille O'Neal (31)
| Shaquille O'Neal (10)
| Nick Van Exel (6)
| Reunion Arena18,042
| 32-12
|- style="background:#cfc;"
| 45
| January 29
| @ San Antonio
| W 99-92
| Eddie Jones (23)
| Shaquille O'Neal (19)
| Nick Van Exel (12)
| Alamodome25,570
| 33-12

|- style="background:#cfc;"
| 46
| February 2
| Washington
| W 129-99
| Shaquille O'Neal (24)
| Elden Campbell (10)
| Nick Van Exel (6)
| Great Western Forum17,505
| 34-12
|- style="background:#fcc;"
| 47
| February 4
| @ L.A. Clippers
| L 86-108
| Campbell & Van Exel (20)
| Travis Knight (7)
| Campbell & Van Exel (4)
| Arrowhead Pond18,462
| 34-13
|- style="background:#cfc;"
| 48
| February 5
| Chicago
| W 106-90
| Elden Campbell (34)
| Elden Campbell (14)
| Nick Van Exel (13)
| Great Western Forum17,505
| 35-13
|- align="center"
|colspan="9" bgcolor="#bbcaff"|All-Star Break
|- style="background:#cfc;"
|- bgcolor="#bbffbb"
|- style="background:#cfc;"
| 49
| February 12
| @ Minnesota
| W 100-84
| Elden Campbell (21)
| Robert Horry (10)
| Robert Horry (8)
| Target Center18,243
| 36-13
|- style="background:#cfc;"
| 50
| February 13
| @ Denver
| W 132-117
| Nick Van Exel (30)
| Kersey & Rooks (6)
| Nick Van Exel (9)
| McNichols Sports Arena16,713
| 37-13
|- style="background:#fcc;"
| 51
| February 16
| Seattle
| L 91-102
| Eddie Jones (26)
| Elden Campbell (17)
| Nick Van Exel (11)
| Great Western Forum17,505
| 37-14
|- style="background:#fcc;"
| 52
| February 19
| Cleveland
| L 84-103
| Elden Campbell (23)
| Travis Knight (9)
| Nick Van Exel (7)
| Great Western Forum16,402
| 37-15
|- style="background:#cfc;"
| 53
| February 21
| Vancouver
| W 99-91
| Campbell & Jones (23)
| Elden Campbell (12)
| Jones & Van Exel (8)
| Great Western Forum17,031
| 38-15
|- style="background:#fcc;"
| 54
| February 23
| New York
| L 121-127 (2OT)
| Elden Campbell (40)
| Travis Knight (13)
| Nick Van Exel (16)
| Great Western Forum17,505
| 38-16
|- style="background:#fcc;"
| 55
| February 25
| @ Houston
| L 96-100
| Elden Campbell (19)
| Elden Campbell (9)
| Nick Van Exel (11)
| The Summit16,285
| 38-17
|- style="background:#cfc;"
| 56
| February 27
| @ Washington
| W 122-107
| Elden Campbell (38)
| Eddie Jones (8)
| Nick Van Exel (12)
| US Airways Arena18,756
| 39-17
|- style="background:#fcc;"
| 57
| February 28
| @ Atlanta
| L 75-86
| Eddie Jones (17)
| Elden Campbell (7)
| Eddie Jones (5)
| Omni Coliseum16,378
| 39-18

|- style="background:#fcc;"
| 58
| March 2
| @ Indiana
| L 85-101
| Eddie Jones (28)
| Corie Blount (10)
| Nick Van Exel (9)
| Market Square Arena16,711
| 39-19
|- style="background:#cfc;"
| 59
| March 4
| @ Dallas
| W 102-92
| Nick Van Exel (37)
| Elden Campbell (10)
| 4 players tied (2)
| Reunion Arena15,809
| 40-19
|- style="background:#fcc;"
| 60
| March 7
| Houston
| L 90-111
| Campbell & Jones (17)
| Elden Campbell (7)
| Nick Van Exel (6)
| Great Western Forum17,505
| 40-20
|- style="background:#cfc;"
| 61
| March 9
| New Jersey
| W 115-105
| Eddie Jones (34)
| Eddie Jones (13)
| Fisher & Van Exel (5)
| Great Western Forum17,103
| 41-20
|- style="background:#cfc;"
| 62
| March 12
| Golden State
| W 109-101
| Elden Campbell (26)
| Corie Blount (15)
| Nick Van Exel (14)
| Great Western Forum17,009
| 42-20
|- style="background:#fcc;"
| 63
| March 14
| L.A. Clippers
| L 95-97
| Eddie Jones (22)
| Corie Blount (15)
| Nick Van Exel (13)
| Great Western Forum17,505
| 42-21
|- style="background:#cfc;"
| 64
| March 16
| Toronto
| W 98-90 (OT)
| Eddie Jones (27)
| Jerome Kersey (11)
| Nick Van Exel (8)
| Great Western Forum16,839
| 43-21
|- style="background:#cfc;"
| 65
| March 17
| @ Denver
| W 113-94
| Nick Van Exel (30)
| Blount & Campbell (10)
| Nick Van Exel (9)
| McNichols Sports Arena13,817
| 44-21
|- style="background:#cfc;"
| 66
| March 20
| @ Cleveland
| W 89-76
| Eddie Jones (25)
| Corie Blount (12)
| Nick Van Exel (7)
| Gund Arena18,818
| 45-21
|- style="background:#fcc;"
| 67
| March 21
| @ Miami
| L 97-98
| Elden Campbell (24)
| Elden Campbell (12)
| Nick Van Exel (11)
| Miami Arena15,200
| 45-22
|- style="background:#fcc;"
| 68
| March 23
| @ Orlando
| L 84-110
| Elden Campbell (16)
| Blount & Kersey (8)
| Nick Van Exel (6)
| Orlando Arena17,248
| 45-23
|- style="background:#cfc;"
| 69
| March 24
| @ New Jersey
| W 109-84
| Nick Van Exel (23)
| Travis Knight (14)
| Nick Van Exel (8)
| Continental Airlines Arena20,049
| 46-23
|- style="background:#cfc;"
| 70
| March 26
| Milwaukee
| W 106-84
| Elden Campbell (31)
| Corie Blount (14)
| 3 players tied (4)
| Great Western Forum17,505
| 47-23
|- style="background:#cfc;"
| 71
| March 27
| @ Vancouver
| W 102-98 (OT)
| Elden Campbell (25)
| Elden Campbell (9)
| Nick Van Exel (8)
| General Motors Place18,722
| 48-23

|- style="background:#cfc;"
| 72
| April 1
| @ Seattle
| W 99-97
| Nick Van Exel (30)
| Blount & Kersey (11)
| Nick Van Exel (6)
| KeyArena17,072
| 49-23
|- style="background:#cfc;"
| 73
| April 2
| Denver
| W 110-85
| Eddie Jones (27)
| Corie Blount (13)
| Nick Van Exel (12)
| Great Western Forum17,141
| 50-23
|- style="background:#fcc;"
| 74
| April 4
| San Antonio
| L 83-94
| Sean Rooks (20)
| Corie Blount (13)
| Nick Van Exel (5)
| Great Western Forum17,505
| 50-24
|- style="background:#cfc;"
| 75
| April 6
| Dallas
| W 87-80
| Derek Fisher (21)
| Sean Rooks (11)
| 3 players tied (5)
| Great Western Forum17,364
| 51-24
|- style="background:#cfc;"
| 76
| April 8
| @ Golden State
| W 109-85
| Kobe Bryant (24)
| Knight & Rooks (7)
| Derek Fisher (6)
| San Jose Arena17,973
| 52-24
|- style="background:#fcc;"
| 77
| April 9
| @ Utah
| L 89-101
| Eddie Jones (16)
| Elden Campbell (11)
| Derek Fisher (4)
| Delta Center19,911
| 52-25
|- style="background:#cfc;"
| 78
| April 11
| Phoenix
| W 114-98
| O'Neal & Van Exel (24)
| Horry & O'Neal (11)
| Nick Van Exel (9)
| Great Western Forum17,505
| 53-25
|- style="background:#cfc;"
| 79
| April 13
| Utah
| W 100-98
| Shaquille O'Neal (39)
| Shaquille O'Neal (13)
| Nick Van Exel (7)
| Great Western Forum17,505
| 54-25
|- style="background:#cfc;"
| 80
| April 17
| Sacramento
| W 108-99
| Shaquille O'Neal (42)
| Shaquille O'Neal (12)
| Nick Van Exel (7)
| Great Western Forum17,505
| 55-25
|- style="background:#cfc;"
| 81
| April 18
| @ L.A. Clippers
| W 123-95
| Elden Campbell (21)
| Travis Knight (9)
| Nick Van Exel (10)
| Los Angeles Memorial Sports Arena16,094
| 56-25
|- style="background:#fcc;"
| 82
| April 20
| @ Portland
| L 96-100
| Elden Campbell (29)
| Elden Campbell (11)
| Nick Van Exel (8)
| Rose Garden21,538
| 56-26

Playoffs

|- style="background:#cfc;"
| 1
| April 25
| Portland
| W 95–77
| Shaquille O'Neal (46)
| Shaquille O'Neal (11)
| Nick Van Exel (8)
| Great Western Forum17,505
| 1–0
|- style="background:#cfc;"
| 2
| April 27
| Portland
| W 107–93
| Shaquille O'Neal (30)
| Eddie Jones (7)
| Nick Van Exel (9)
| Great Western Forum17,505
| 2–0
|- style="background:#fcc;"
| 3
| April 30
| @ Portland
| L 90–98
| Shaquille O'Neal (29)
| Shaquille O'Neal (12)
| O'Neal & Van Exel (4)
| Rose Garden21,538
| 2–1
|- style="background:#cfc;"
| 4
| May 2
| @ Portland
| W 95–91
| Campbell & O'Neal (27)
| 4 players tied (8)
| Jones & Van Exel (5)
| Rose Garden21,538
| 3–1
|-

|- style="background:#fcc;"
| 1
| May 4
| @ Utah
| L 77–93
| Nick Van Exel (23)
| Shaquille O'Neal (12)
| Nick Van Exel (4)
| Delta Center19,911
| 0–1
|- style="background:#fcc;"
| 2
| May 6
| @ Utah
| L 101–103
| Shaquille O'Neal (25)
| Shaquille O'Neal (12)
| Nick Van Exel (12)
| Delta Center19,911
| 0–2
|- style="background:#cfc;"
| 3
| May 8
| Utah
| W 104–84
| Kobe Bryant (19)
| Shaquille O'Neal (10)
| Nick Van Exel (5)
| Great Western Forum17,505
| 1–2
|- style="background:#fcc;"
| 4
| May 10
| Utah
| L 95–110
| Shaquille O'Neal (34)
| Shaquille O'Neal (11)
| Nick Van Exel (7)
| Great Western Forum17,505
| 1–3
|- style="background:#fcc;"
| 5
| May 12
| @ Utah
| L 93–98 (OT)
| Nick Van Exel (26)
| Shaquille O'Neal (13)
| Shaquille O'Neal (5)
| Delta Center19,911
| 1–4
|-

Player statistics

Regular season

Playoffs

NOTE: Please write the players statistics in alphabetical order by last name.

Awards and records
 Shaquille O'Neal, 1997 Kids' Choice Awards Favorite Male Athlete
 Shaquille O'Neal, All-NBA Third Team
 Kobe Bryant, NBA All-Rookie Team 2nd Team
 Travis Knight, NBA All-Rookie Team 2nd Team

Transactions

References

 Lakers on Database Basketball
 Lakers on Basketball Reference

Los Angeles Lakers seasons
Los Angle
Los Angle
Los Angle